The Whole Family Works is a 1939 Japanese drama film written and directed by Mikio Naruse. It is based on a novel by Sunao Tokunaga.

Plot
The working class Ishimura family, living on the brink of poverty, depends on the salaries of the father and his three eldest sons, Kiichi, Genji and Noboru, who became factory workers immediately after elementary school. Kiichi sees no prospect of a promotion or salary raise at his job, meaning he could never support a family of his own, and expresses his wish to go to a higher school. While his mother objects against his plan, which would result in a decrease of the family's income, his father is torn between financial necessity and his son's happiness. Mr. Ishimura consults teacher Ogawa, explaining that if he allows Kiichi to follow his ambitions, he would have to allow his other sons the same. During a family meeting, moderated by Ogawa, Mr. Ishimura announces that he will accept his sons' decisions. While Kiichi assures Ogawa that he will work hard, and his younger brothers rejoice, the parents appear worried.

Cast
 Musei Tokugawa as Mr. Ishimura
 Noriko Honma as Mrs. Ishimura
 Akira Ubukata as Kiichi
 Kaoru Itō as Genji
 Seikichi Minami as Noboru
 Takeshi Hirata as Eisaku
 Den Ohinata as Ogawa, the teacher
 Sumie Tsubaki as Mitsuko

Release
The Whole Family Works premiered in Japan on March 11, 1939. It was shown in the U.S. as part of a 25 films Naruse retrospective in 1985, organised by the Kawakita Memorial Film Institute and film scholar Audie Bock.

Legacy
Naruse biographer Catherine Russell cites The Whole Family Works, together with his 1939 Sincerity, as the director's two key films of this period and the "link between Naruse's prewar and postwar shoshimin-eiga".

References

External links

1939 films
1939 drama films
Japanese drama films
Films based on Japanese novels
Films directed by Mikio Naruse
1930s Japanese-language films